Liuzhi Special District is a district of Guizhou, China. It was known as Langdai Country before 1960. The county is under the administration of Liupanshui city, located in the western part of Guizhou Province. It is bounded by Zhijing and Nayong to the north, Guanling to the south, Zhenning and Puding to the east, Shuichen to the west, as well as Qinglong and Pu'an to the southwest. The population is 729,000. There are about 32 ethnic minorities and they account for 30.52% of the population.

Liuzhi is an important coal mining base in Guizhou.

Administrative Divisions 
Liuzhi governs over 3 subdistrict, 9 towns and 6 townships.

Subdistricts

 Jiulong (九龙街道)
 Yinhu  (银壶街道)
 Tashan (塔山街道)

Towns

 Yanjiao (岩脚镇)
 Mugang (木岗镇)
 Dayong (大用镇)
 Guanzhai (关寨镇)
 Zangke (牂牁镇)
 Xinhua (新华镇)
 Longhe (龙河镇)
 Xinyao (新窑镇)
 Langdai (郎岱镇)

Townships

 Suojia Miao and Yi ethnic township (梭戛苗族彝族回族乡)
 Niuchang Miao and Yi ethnic township (牛场苗族彝族乡)
 Xinchang (新场乡)
 Zhongzhai Miao, Yi and Buyi ethnic township (中寨苗族彝族布依族乡)
 Luobie Buyi and Yi ethnic township (落别布依族彝族乡)
 Yuelianghe Yi, Buyi and Miao ethnic township (月亮河彝族布依族苗族乡)

Climate

References

County-level divisions of Guizhou
Liupanshui